The Paterson Fire Department provides fire protection, hazardous materials services, and emergency medical services to the city of Paterson, New Jersey. With a population of 159,732 Paterson is New Jersey's third largest city.

The department is part of the Metro USAR Strike Team, which consists of nine North Jersey fire departments and other emergency services divisions working to address major emergency rescue situations.

Stations and apparatus
 below is a complete listing of all station and apparatus in the Paterson Fire Department.

Disbanded Fire Companies
Throughout the history of the Paterson Fire Department, several fire companies have been disbanded due to departmental reorganization, budget, and renumbering. Listed are some recent company changes.
 Engine Company 8 - 221 Union Ave. - Disbanded 2006
 Engine Company 9 - 77 Highland St. - Disbanded 1989
 Engine Company 10 - 236 Lafayette St. - Disbanded 1984
 Engine Company 11 - 97 Grand St. - Disbanded 1982
 Engine Company 12 - 36 Circle Ave. - Disbanded 1982
 Engine Company 13 - 125 Trenton Ave. - Disbanded 1982
 Squad Company 1 - 115 Van Houten St. - Disbanded 1982
 Satellite Unit 9 - 77 Highland St.

See also
Paterson Police Department

References

Fire departments in New Jersey
Paterson, New Jersey